Assam silk denotes the three major types of indigenous wild silks produced in Assam—golden muga, white pat and warm eri silk. The Assam silk industry, now centered in Sualkuchi, is a labor-intensive industry.

History 

Assam was well known for the production of high quality silk since ancient times. The craft of weaving goes along with the production of silk. It grew to such sophistication in Assam that it was known all over India and abroad. In the Kishkindha Kanda of Ramayana, it is stated that one travelling towards the east has to first pass through Magadha, Anga, Pundra and then the Kosha-karanam-bhumi ("the country of cocoon rearers"). Kautilya’s Arthashastra, a political literature of the 3rd century BC, makes references to the highly sophisticated silk clothing from Assam. Kautilya mentions the production of Suvarnakudyaka (from Kamrupa) along with Vangika (from Vanga/southern Bengal), Magadhika (from Magadha) and Paundrika (from Pundra/northern Bengal), of which Suvarnakudyaka, Magadhika and Paundrika fabrics were types of Kauseya (Tussar/Muga) and Cina-patta (Mulberry silk). The fact that Kamrupa produced Suvarnakudyaka is confirmed by the 8th-century writer Kumārila Bhaṭṭa who, in his commentary of Arthashatra, said that Kamrupa was Suvarnakudya(Kamarupeschaiva Suvarna Kudyah). As per the Arthashatra, the fibres of Suvarnakudyaka were of 'the colour of butter', 'as red as the sun', and of the best quality. Due to this description of colour, the type of silk can be easily identified as Muga. The text also refers to four trees (Vakula, Likucha, Vata and Naga-vriksa) which the silkworms feed on. Out of these, Vakula and Naga-vriksa<ref>Journal Of Bihar And Orissa Research Society  Vol. 3, p.215, "There is some doubt in identifying the Naga tree named in the Arthashastra. Lexicographers take it to denote the tree, Naga-kesara and Punnaga, the flowers of which possess yellow anther..A synonym of Naga-kesara is Champeya, because the flower of Champaka (Michelina champac) is yellow; and it is no less remarkable that the Champa silk once celebrates in Assam was fine white." p. 212, "There is  a variety of muga called Champa muga, its worms feeding on leaves of Champa tree (Michelia champaca). Sir George Watt tells us that "the Chpa silk seems almost quite forgotten to-day, but it was the fine white silk worn by the kings and nobles of Assam in former times"."</ref> belong to the genus Ericales and Magnolia which the Muga silkworm Antheraea assamensis is known to feed on; while Likucha (Artocarpus lakucha) and Vata belong to the genus Moraceae(Mulberry) which the Pat Silkworm feeds on. This is further confirmed from the 9th century thesaurus Amara-kosha which mentions that the worms of the fibre Patrorna (a form of white silk), fed on the leaves of Vata, Lakucha, etc. The Arthashastra also states that the fibre was spun while the threads were wet, indicating that the production method was still the same at that period. The ancient text Kalika Purana(dated between 10th-11th century) well records the use of silk in the worship of deities in ancient Kamrupa. As per the text, while worshipping the deities at the Dikkarvasini pitha(also known as Tamreswari of Sadiya), red, yellow and white Kauseya(meaning wild silk, probably Muga) were used to drap the idols of the presiding deities of the temple.Shastri, B.N, "The Kalikapurana: Text, Introduction and English Trans. with Shloka Index", p. 1243-45, "O king! Listen to the procedure of worship of Brahma with rapt attention...Red silk(rakta-kauseya-vastram) is his (Brahma's) favourite cloth, rice cooked with milk, sesames, mixed with ghee are his favourite food." It is known that Muga, in olden times, was available in yellow(natural), white(Mejankari muga) and often dyed red with lac.

The knowledge of sericulture probably arrived with the Tibeto-Burman groups which arrived from China around the period of 3000-2000 BC. Moreover, there was another trade of Silk through the Southwestern Silk road which started from China, passed through Burma and Assam, finally getting connected to the main silk road in Turkmenistan. There are various other records to show that silk came to India through Assam. As per the Sanskrit text Harshacharita (biography of North Indian ruler Harshavardhan written by the court poet Banabhatta in the 7th century), during the coronation ceremony of King Harshavardhan, king Bhaskarvarman of Kamrupa gifted many precious items to the North Indian king. Out of this the most important ones include the precious fabrics and jewels. These included an umbrella wrapped by a dukula cloth, sacks of patta-sutra cloth as well as ksoma fabrics which were as pure as the autumn moon's light (sharada chandrama shaucha ksamani). These fabrics could either be silk or linen. It is also mentioned in the text that the loin fibres were so even and polished that it resembled Bhoj-patra, which could indicate silk as well. There are also references of Assam silk in the records written by Huen Sang where he has written the use and trade of silk in Kamrupa during the rule of king Bhaskar Varman. Ram Mohan Nath in his book The Background of Assamese Culture states that it would be "clear that in ancient times traders from different parts of Tibet, Central Asia and China flocked to Assam through various routes, and as they traded mostly in silk, they were generally called Seres – Cirrahadoi – Syrities – Cirata – Kirata. The word Kirata therefore, is a general term referring to the people of the Mongoloid origin and it refers specially to the Bodos." These Bodos referred by Nath are today known as Kacharis which includes groups such as Boros, Dimasas, Chutias, Rabhas, Sonowal, Garo and Koch. J. Geoghegan in his book Silk in India states that:  "Whatever may be the date of the introduction of the worm, its geographical distribution at present day, and the fact species first introduced was a multivoltine, seem to me to lead to the conclusion that the insect was first introduced into India from the north-east."

Genetic research on silkworms show that Assam silk originated in two specific regions of Assam. One was Garo Hills in the ancient Kamrupa kingdom and the other was Dhakuakhana in the ancient Chutia kingdom.

Types of Assam Silk

 Muga silk 

Muga silk is the product of the silkworm Antheraea assamensis endemic to Assam. The larvae of these moths feed on som (Machilus bombycina) and sualu (Litsaea polyantha) leaves. The silk produced is known for its glossy, fine texture and durability. It was previously reported that muga silk cannot be dyed or bleached due to "low porosity", but this is incorrect; muga takes dye like any other silk.  This silk can be hand washed with its lustre increasing after every wash. Very often the silk outlives its owner.

In 2015, Adarsh Gupta K of Nagaraju's research team at Centre for DNA Fingerprinting and Diagnostics, Hyderabad, India, discovered the complete sequence and the protein structure of muga silk fibroin and published it in Nature Scientific Reports

Muga silk has been given the Geographical Indication (GI) status since 2007 and the logo for authentic production has been registered with Assam Science Technology and Environment Council. The Central Silk Board of India has the authority to inspect Muga silk products, certify their authenticity and allow traders to use the GI logo.

 White Pat silk 

Pat silk is produced by Bombyx textor silkworms which feed on mulberry (Morus spp.) leaves. It is usually brilliant white or off-white in colour. Its cloth can dry in shadow.

 Eri silk 

Eri silk is made by Samia cynthia ricini which feed on leaves of castor oil plant (Ricinus communis''). It is also known as endi or errandi silk. Because manufacturing process of eri allows the pupae to develop into adults and only the open ended cocoons are used for turning into silk, it is also popularly known as non-violent silk. This silk is soft and warm and is popular as shawls and quilts.

The silk industry of Sualkuchi 
Sualkuchi is a multi-caste town of Kamrup (rural) district of Assam, situated on the north bank of the mighty Brahmaputra at a distance of 30 km west of Guwahati. The town is linked with Guwahati by P.W.D roads and with Palashbari on the south bank by motor boat and country boat. As per 2001 Census, the total population of Sualkuchi was 21,252 with 4,023 households. The average household size is 5.28 with sex ratio 1045. The literacy rate is 64%. S/C, S/T population constitutes 26% and 2% respectively of total population of Sualkuchi. Sualkuchi is located in the latitude of 26°10'0"N and the longitude of 91°34'0"E. The hottest season of the year in Sualkuchi are May to middle part of September. As mighty river Brahmaputra flows in the South direction of the village, a sort of breezy air flows throughout the year. The village is thickly populated. Approximately there are 2,24,381 peoples (according to 2001 census report) inhabitants in this village. The major occupation of the people in this village is weaving. Almost every household has weaving hand-loom  machine  to manufacture the Assamese traditional silk wear .  Most of the areas in this village are plain but in some part of north-eastern and central side in this village are covered by small hills.

As per the Census report of 2001, the workforce participation rate in the town was 37.93% of the total populations, of which only 0.53% were cultivators, 1.2% were agricultural labours, 56.37% were engaged in household industries and the remaining 41.90% were engaged in other activities.

History

Although silk was cultivated and woven by women all around Assam, the silk clothes of a particular place named Sualkuchi achieved much fame during the Kamarupa as well as Ahom rule. Sualkuchi is said to have been established in the 11th Century by King Dharma Pala of the Pala dynasty that ruled western Assam from 900 AD to about 1100 AD. Dharmapala, the story goes, brought 26 weaver families from Tantikuchi in Barpeta to Sualkuchi and created a weavers' village close to modern-day Guwahati. Silk was given royal patronage during that period and Sualkuchi was made an important centre of silk weaving.  The Hand-loom industry of Sualkuchi encompasses cotton textile, silk textile as well as Khadi cloth which are, in fact, traditional cloth endowing high social and moral value in and outside the state. However, Sualkuchi is well known for silk textiles both mulberry and muga silk. In fact muga, "the golden fibre" is produced only in Assam and it has also tremendous export potentiality. Such activities are intimately linked with the culture and tradition of the Assamese people since long past.

Having a long tradition of silk weaving at least since the 17th century, Sualkuchi is the prime centre of the silk hand-loom industry of Assam. Although originally it was a "craft village" having several cottage industries till the forties of the last century such as hand-loom weaving industry, oil processing in the traditional ghani, goldsmithi, pottery etc., the industries other than hand-loom are now almost extinct and the artisans have already taken up silk weaving as a profession. Although the weaving industry of Sualkuchi remained almost confined within the Tanti Community of Tantipara up-to the 1930, later people belonging to other communities also started to take up silk weaving gradually. Now, even the fishermen of the Koibortapara hamlet of Bamun-Sualkuchi and the Brahmin families have also given up their ascriptive caste occupations to a larger extent and they have taken up silk weaving as the main source of income.

The weaving industry of Sualkuchi received a big boost during the Second World War. The growing demand for fabrics and their increasing prices, encouraged a few Tanti families to introduce weaving commercially and they started weaving factories engaging hired wage weavers. Today, the factory system with semi-automatic Fly shuttle handloom has already been extended to entire Sualkuchi and 73.78% of the households of the town are being engaged with commercial weaving of hand-loom. The Census of Hand-looms in Sualkuchi conducted in 2002 reveals that Sualkuchi has 13752 active commercial hand-looms, of which 54.75% are performed by the woman weavers, who are basically hired from the outside of Sualkuchi. Although the hired wage weavers were originally the local poor from the Bamun-Sualkuchi area of the east and Bhatipara hamlet of the west, a flow of migrated wage weavers from different parts of Assam has emerged gradually since eighties of the last century and presently migrant weavers are dominating the wage weavers of the town.

Even Gandhiji, the father of the nation was also highly surprised about the art and culture of weaving of the Assamese women when he visited an exhibition of eri and khadi clothes in Sualkuchi on 9 January 1946. He was greatly astonished when he saw that one of the expert weavers of the silk town had depicted him in the cloth produced in his hand-loom.

"Khat khat khat khatsalare sabade prean mor nite nachuyai" was one of the most popular radio songs composed and sung during the fifties of the last century by the present artist pensioner Narayan Chandra Das Of Sualkuchhi.  Actually the 'click-clack click-clack'  sound of the loom make the soul of the passerby dance with the rhythmic rattle of the shuttle flying through the sheds of the wrap. No doubt, there are nearly 12 lakh throw and fly-shuttle handlooms in Assam, but most of them are domestic weaving a few metres of cloth for the use by the family members. There are also some semi commercial looms producing some metres of fabrics for the market during the off hours of the house-wives doing either independently or under some so called "Mahajans" who supply yarn to the poor weavers, who return the woven cloth against wages per piece.

The number of purely commercial looms working throughout the year and producing different varieties of fabrics only for the market is not very much encouraging. The silk loom of Sualkuchi and the Cittaranjan looms of Silchar had held a predominant position as per a report of the Textile Enquiry Committee of 1954. Sualkuchi However holds now the unique position in Assam nay in North East India by producing pat (mulberry), muga and tasar fabrics of various designs and colors.  It has very expert designers and weavers. On the occasion of the visit of Mahatma Gandhi to Sualkuchi on January 9, 1946, one designer Rajen Deka, designed the picture of Gandhiji got it woven in a piece of pat cloth and was presented to him. The woven picture was so fine that even the two broken front teeth of Gandhiji with a smiling face were depicted and while seeing the picture the father of the nation remarked that the weavers could weave dreams in their cloth.

Sualkuchi an ancient craft village-having silk-rearing and weaving communities, potters, goldsmiths and oil pressures. While silk-rearing vanished long time ago, the gani industry perished during the early the part of the last century as the 'Mudois' of Sualkuchi. Now in 21st century the local weavers and  artisans of sualkuchi  are using digital platform to promote their products globally.

See also
 Kausheya (silk)
 Mekhela chador
 Mysore silk
 Ilkal saree
 Navalgund Durries

Notes

External links 
 Information on Wild silkmoths

Wild silk
Silk in India
Economy of Assam
Textiles and clothing of Assam
Geographical indications in Assam